Juan Carlos Harriott, Jr. was an Argentine polo player. He was born October 28, 1936. He was known as "Juancarlitos" to distinguish him from his father and was also given the nickname "El Ingles". In 1953 he obtained a polo handicap of 1, and then was soon raised to 3 in the same year. He reached a handicap of 10 goals in 1961. He stayed at a 10 goal handicap until his retirement in 1980. He holds the record of having won the Argentine Open Polo Championship 20 times, the Hurlingham Open 15 times, and the Tortugas Open 7 times. He also holds the record with his team Colonel Suárez of 38 tournaments won. He won the Triple Crown four times (1972 , 1974 , 1975 and 1977), 2 of them consecutively. Representing Argentina he won in the Copa de las Américas in 1966, 1969, 1979, and 1980. He also won the Sesquicentennial Cup in 1966. In 1975 and 1976, with the Villafranca team, he won the Sotogrande Gold Cup, Spain.

Tournament results
Argentine Polo Open Championship (20): 1957, 1958, 1959, 1961, 1962, 1963, 1964, 1965, 1967, 1968, 1969, 1970, 1971, 1972, 1974, 1975, 1976, 1977, 1978 and 1979.

References

Argentine polo players
Living people
1936 births